Year of the Monkey is a 2019 memoir by Patti Smith. The work describes a single year in Smith's life, 2016, which she spent traveling on her own. The book is part travelogue and part dream journal, as Smith often interrupts the narrative to describe her dreams.

References

Books by Patti Smith
2019 non-fiction books
American memoirs
Alfred A. Knopf books